Buettneria is a genus of air-breathing land snails, terrestrial gastropod mollusks in the family Urocyclidae.

Buettnerella was the nomen novum for Buettneria Simroth, 1888.

Species
There are two species within the genus Buettneria:
 Buettneria garambaensis Van Goethem, 1975 
 Buettneria leuckharti Simroth, 1889

References

 Van Goethem, J.L. (1977). Révision systématique des Urocyclinae (Mollusca, Pulmonata, Urocylidae). Annales du Musée Royal de l'Afrique Centrale, Sciences Zoologiques, 218: XI + 355 pp., 720 figg., pl. 1-4. Tervuren.
 Bank, R. A. (2017). Classification of the Recent terrestrial Gastropoda of the World. Last update: July 16, 2017

External links
 Simroth, H. (1888). Über die azorisch-portugiesische Nacktschneckenfauna und ihre Beziehungen. Zoologischer Anzeiger. 11: 86-90

Urocyclidae
Gastropod genera